Skylanders: Giants is a 2012 video game in the Skylanders series, a direct sequel to the 2011 game Skylanders: Spyro's Adventure and features the voices of Kevin Michael Richardson, Greg Ellis, Peter Lurie, Steve Blum, Dave Wittenberg, Carlos Alazraqui, Kevin Sorbo, Bobcat Goldthwait, Patrick Seitz and Julie Nathanson.  As the title suggests, it features larger Skylanders known as "Giants", along with other new gameplay mechanics. 16 new skylanders were introduced, including 8 "Giants": Bouncer, Crusher, Eye-Brawl, Hot Head, Ninjini, Swarm, Thumpback and Tree Rex.

It was released for Nintendo 3DS, PlayStation 3, Wii, and Xbox 360 on 17 October 2012 in Australia, on 19 October 2012 in Europe, on 21 October 2012 in North America, and on 22 November 2012 in Brazil by Neoplay. It has also been released on the Wii U as a launch title in North America, Europe and Australia. This is the final Skylanders game to be owned by Vivendi before Activision became an independent company on 25 July 2013.

Gameplay 
Skylanders: Giants builds upon the fundamentals of the first game, which merges a line of physical toy figures with a video game world. The game introduced over 40 new toy figures, some of which are more than twice the size of the original Skylanders cast in both physical and virtual form. The game involves connecting a physical toy to the video game console through a "Portal of Power"; whichever toy is used creates a respective character in the game. Toy figures from the first game are also forward compatible with Giants, although there are also new versions, called "Series 2", which have more powerful attributes than the originals. If the Series 2 Skylanders are used in the first game, they act as their own Series 1 counterparts. A new series of figurines called "LightCore" was also introduced, which glow when put on the Portal of Power and have a flash bomb attack in-game. The game has a new and improved "Battle Mode" for head-to-head play, featuring more areas and gameplay options as well as offering a new variety of alter ego Skylanders.

Plot 
The main villain from the last game, Kaos, finds himself shrunk and put on display in a toy store on Earth. He finds a Portal of Power, and goes back to the Skylands. The first level takes place 10,000 years ago to discover how the Giants became the first Skylanders. 10,000 years ago, the Skylands were ruled by an evil race of giant robots called Arkeyans. They forced the inhabitants of Skylands to work as slaves, but the Skylanders made a stand and began war with the Arkeyans. Eventually, the Giants face off with the king of the Arkeyans and removes the source of the Arkeyans' power, the Iron Fist of Arkus. However, this victory backfired on the Giants and they were sent to Earth. miniaturized and petrified, due to the human world's lack of magic. These Giants eventually were thought to be myths because of their unexplained disappearance.

Back in modern day, the Portal Master and the Skylanders must repair Flynn's ship (known as the Dread-Yacht). Multiple new characters show up throughout the levels, including Ermit the hermit and Brock the drow (dark elf) gladiator. Ermit reveals that Kaos has returned and has accidentally awakened an ancient Arkeyan Conquertron, which recruits Kaos as its new leader, and goes on the search for the Lost City of Arkus and claim the Iron Fist. The Skylanders must then race Kaos to the Lost City, and Ermit tells the skylanders that he has a giant robot of his own. While attempting to activate the robot, the player encounters a "machine ghost" which turns out to be the soul of Ermit's robot, who also aids the Skylanders on their journey.

The Skylanders travel to an ancient vault which is said to contain a map to the city of Arkus, but Kaos arrives and attempts to crush the player with falling rocks. In an effort to save the player, Machine Ghost sacrifices himself by shielding the Skylanders from the falling rocks using his robotic body. Kaos and his robot travel into the vault to find the map, but the map is destroyed as a result when he accidentally pulled a mechanism. Glumshanks, Kaos' troll butler, remembers an image of the map, and with Kaos' help, finds the location of the lost city. Meanwhile, Machine Ghost tells the player to go after Kaos and find the lost City of Arkus, before disappearing, presumably dead.

Despite the Skylanders' efforts in reaching the Lost City of Arkus, Kaos manages to reach the Iron Fist of Arkus and transformed into a large Arkeyan robot, preparing his conquest over Skylands. The player soon reached Kaos within the City of Arkus, only to discover that the now robotic Portal Master was impossible to stop unless the Iron Fist of Arkus was removed from his grasp. With the help of Ermit and the revived Machine Ghost, the Skylander was able to remove the Fist of Arkus, returning Kaos to his normal form and stopping him from commanding his Arkeyan army. The Arkeyan Conquertron carries Glumshanks and Kaos out of the collapsing city and to the safety of an island before shutting down completely.

Post-credits, Kaos and Glumshanks are shown entering Kaos' Kastle. There they run into Kaos's mother, whose shadow is only shown, as we are left to wonder what happened next. If players complete Nightmare Mode, they are given a scene where Chompies dance and party around the deactivated Iron Fist of Arkus.

Starter Packs

Console Starter Pack 
These Starter Pack accessories are:
 Skylanders Giants disc
 Poster of all the Skylanders from Skylanders Giants
 Portal of Power
 Trading cards (3)
 Stickers and codes (3)
 3 Skylanders figures: Tree Rex (Giant - Life), Cynder (Series 2 - Undead), and Jet-Vac (Air)

3DS Starter Pack 
The 3DS Starter Pack contains the portal, 3DS game card, and a Punch Pop Fizz figure instead of Jet-Vac.

Development 

It was shown at E3 2012.

Reception 

Skylanders: Giants received "generally favorable" reviews for most platforms according to review aggregator Metacritic; the Nintendo 3DS version received "mixed or average" reviews.

IGN gave the game an 8 out of 10 score, calling it a "...a more polished but by-the-numbers sequel that’s really fun to play". PlayStation Lifestyle, however, gave the game a lower score with a 70/100, saying, "The reality is that Skylanders: Giants is age-appropriate fun that harkens back to the delight you had collecting Pokémon cards or mashing your way through a dungeon crawler. If you've got little ones, then you already know the verdict here."

Sales 
Skylanders: Giants generated over $195 million in U.S. sales in 2012. In the first two weeks of sales, 500,000 Starter Packs and Portal Owner Packs were sold in the U.S. and Europe. A few months after its release, Activision reported that they had generated a billion dollars in sales for the franchise overall, just 15 months after the first game.

References

External links 
 
 

2012 video games
3D platform games
Activision games
Cooperative video games
Dinosaurs in video games
Multiplayer and single-player video games
Nintendo 3DS games
Nintendo Network games
PlayStation 3 games
Role-playing video games
Science fantasy video games
Superhero video games
Toys for Bob games
Toys-to-life games
Vicarious Visions games
Video game sequels
Video games scored by Lorne Balfe
Video games using Havok
Wii games
Wii U games
Xbox 360 games
D.I.C.E. Award for Family Game of the Year winners
Video games developed in the United States
Giants